Vittoria Puccini (born 18 November 1981) is an Italian film and television actress.

Since her success as the lead actress in 2003-2005 costume drama television series Elisa di Rivombrosa, she has continued to work in television and movie productions.

She has a daughter (born 2006) with Italian actor and Elisa di Rivombrosa co-star Alessandro Preziosi. Her newest production is the television series Il Processo, where she played one of the main roles.

Filmography

Film
Tutto l'amore che c'è, directed by Sergio Rubini (2000)
Paz!, directed by Renato De Maria (2002)
Operazione Appia Antica, directed by Carlo Lizzani (2003)
But When Do the Girls Get Here?, directed by Pupi Avati (2005)
At a Glance, directed by Sergio Rubini (2008)
Kiss Me Again, directed by Gabriele Muccino (2010) (2011) 
The Perfect Life, directed by Lucio Pellegrini (2011)
Steel, directed by Stefano Mordini (2012)
Magnificent Presence, directed by Ferzan Özpetek (2012)
Tutta colpa di Freud, directed by Paolo Genovese (2014)
The Place, directed by Paolo Genovese (2017)
18 Presents, directed by Francesco Amato (2020)

Television
La crociera, directed by Enrico Oldoini – Rai 1 (2001)
Sant'Antonio da Padova, directed by Umberto Marino – Rai Uno (2002)
Elisa di Rivombrosa, directed by Cinzia TH Torrini – Canale 5 (2003-2005)
Nero, directed by Paul Marcus – Rai Uno (2004)
, directed by Robert Dornhelm – Rai Uno  (2006)
Le ragazze di San Frediano, directed by Vittorio Sindoni – Rai Uno (2007)
La baronessa di Carini, directed by Umberto Marino – Rai Uno (2007)
Tutta la verità, directed by Cinzia TH Torrini – Rai Uno (2009)
C'era una volta la città dei matti..., directed by Marco Turco – Rai Uno (2010)
Violetta, directed by Antonio Frazzi – Rai Uno (2011)
Altri tempi, directed by Marco Turco – Rai Uno (2013)
Anna Karenina, directed by Christian Duguay – Rai Uno (2013)
L'Oriana, directed by Marco Turco - Rai Uno (2015)
Romanzo criminale, directed by Francesca Archibugi - Rai Uno (2018)
Mentre ero via, directed by Michele Soavi - Rai Uno (2019)
The Trial, directed by Stefano Lodovichi - Netflix (2019)
La fuggitiva, directed by Carlo Carlei – Rai Uno (2021)
 Non Mi Lasciare / Don't Leave Me (2022)

Commercials
Vittoria works for Pantene as one of its Italian models and ambassadors.

References

External links
Official website (in Italian)

1981 births
Living people
Italian film actresses
Italian television actresses
Actors from Florence
21st-century Italian actresses